Arik Shivek is an Israeli professional basketball head coach. Shivek is the former head coach of the senior Israeli national basketball team, serving from 2009 to 2014, succeeding Zvi Sherf.

Coaching career
Shivek started coaching in 1983, with Maccabi Netanya, and later moved to clubs such as Maccabi Ra’anana, Maccabi Ramat Gan, and Hapoel Tel Aviv. Coach Shivek is known for his calm and composed behaviour on and off the court. Beginning in 2003, he coached the Amsterdam Ricoh Astronauts in the Netherlands, leading it to championships in 2008 and 2009, and the Antwerp Giants in Belgium.

He was the Coach of the Year in the Dutch Premier League in 2005 and 2009, and was named the league's Coach of the Year in 2008, by the website Eurobasket.com.

In December 2009, he was appointed the head basketball coach of the senior Israeli national basketball team.  The Israel Basketball Association permitted him to take the job on a part-time basis.  In June 2011, he re-signed as coach of Dexia Mons-Hainaut for a third straight year, subsequent to declining job offers from teams in France and Germany.

In the 2015–16 season, Shivek coached Israeli club Maccabi Rishon LeZion. He coached the team to its first Israeli championship, after beating powerhouses Maccabi Tel Aviv and Hapoel Jerusalem, on the way to the league title. On February 27, 2017, Shivek was fired.

On May 16, 2017, Shivek became the head coach of Maccabi Tel Aviv, for the Playoffs of the 2016–17 BSL season.

On December 20, 2017, Bnei Herzliya officially announced Shivek as their new head coach.

On January 31, 2019, Shivek returned to Bnei Herzliya for a second stint, signing for the rest of the season.

Honours
Israeli Super League (1):
2016
Israeli Second Division (2):
1991, 2002
Dutch League (3):
2005, 2008, 2009
Belgian Cup (2):
2007, 2011

References

External links
"Eurobasket Arik Shivek Interview", June 7, 2009
"Arik Shivek", Eurobasket Israel, by Peter Buyse, June 1, 2011

Israeli basketball coaches
Living people
Hapoel Tel Aviv B.C. coaches
People from Netanya
1956 births